Brad Keeney (born November 20, 1973) is a former American football defensive tackle who most notably played for the Scottish Claymores of the World League of American Football (WLAF)/NFL Europe (NFL).

Career
Keeney played for the Carolina Cobras of the Arena Football League as an OL/DL from 2000–2002. In 2002, Keeney was signed to the Buffalo Destroyers and released the following year in 2003.

References

1973 births
Living people
Green Bay Packers players
Scottish Claymores players